This was the first edition of the tournament. 
Roberto Maytín and Hans Podlipnik-Castillo won the title, defeating Romain Arneodo and Benjamin Balleret in the final, 6–3, 2–6, [10–4].

Seeds

Draw

Draw

References
 Main Draw

Milex Open - Doubles
2015 Doubles